FC STU Tbilisi is a Georgian football club.

References

Football clubs in Georgia (country)